Jebel Marra is a district of West Darfur state, Sudan.

References

Districts of Sudan